Abacoa is a community in Palm Beach County in the U.S. state of Florida, within the outer city limits of Jupiter. Construction began in 1997 on land once owned by the American businessman John D. MacArthur. The development is an example of the New Urbanism architectural movement in Florida.

History
Abacoa was conceived in 1993, when the MacArthur Foundation proposed the plan to the county of Palm Beach, to be executed on land from MacArthur's endowment. The Foundation opted to partner with a developer, maintaining a 35% minority stake in the project.

Initial home sales were brisk, with 4,000 of 6,000 units built as of 2009. However, tenancy of retail spaces in Abacoa Town Center were sluggish, with a third of 40-some storefronts, as well as the center's movie theater, shuttered as of 2007. Also noted was residents' displeasure that a number of the open establishments were bars that locals found disruptive.

The name derives from that of a village of the Jaega tribe of Native Americans, who were present in the area at the time of Spanish contact.

Culture
Since 2002, Abacoa has hosted the annual Fiesta Maya, based on the traditions of the highland Guatemala town of Jacaltenango, with the participation of the local Jacaltec community as well as students from Florida Atlantic University's Harriet L. Wilkes Honors College.

Planning
Abacoa is split into 17 different neighborhoods, each containing its own style of architecture. At peak, management anticipates Abacoa will contain 6,073 residences, and about 3 million square feet of commercial space.

Abacoa is also home to Roger Dean Stadium, which is located near the Town Center part of the community, an urban open air street with multiple restaurants. Abacoa is also home to Florida Atlantic University's Harriet L. Wilkes Honors College, a Scripps Research Institute sister facility, and the Max Planck Florida Institute for Neuroscience, the Max Planck Society's first non-European research institute.

References

Planned communities in Florida
1997 establishments in Florida
Populated places in Palm Beach County, Florida
Jupiter, Florida
New Urbanism communities